Kentucky Route 304 (KY 304) is a state highway in Central City in Muhlenberg County, Kentucky. The highway runs  from U.S. Route 431 (US 431) and KY 70 east to KY 1031. KY 304 replaced part of KY 70 through downtown Central City in 2009.

Route description
KY 304 begins at the intersection of Front Street and Phillip Stone Way west of downtown Central City. US 431 follows Phillip Stone Way through the intersection, and KY 70 heads west along Front Street and south concurrently with US 431. KY 304 heads east along Front Street, which gradually approaches the east–west Paducah & Louisville Railway line. At closest approach, the highway turns north onto West Reservoir Avenue for a brief concurrency with KY 277. KY 304 turns east onto Broad Street and veers northeast at its intersection with KY 2103 (Center Street). The highway has a grade crossing of CSX's O&N Subdivision rail line before reaching its eastern terminus at KY 1031 (2nd Street). The Kentucky Transportation Cabinet classifies KY 304 as a state secondary highway.

History
The Kentucky Transportation Cabinet established KY 304 through a February 6, 2009, official order to replace part of KY 70 when KY 70 was rerouted with US 431 to bypass downtown Central City.

The original KY 304 went from US 23 (now KY 321) in Auxier east to KY 3 (now KY 302) south of Auxier. This was deleted on December 15, 1988, and became part of rerouted KY 3, while KY 302 was extended south on the old route of KY 3. However, when KY 3 was rerouted off of this road on December 2, 1996, this road became an extension of KY 3051 instead.

Major intersections

References

0304
0304